José Manuel Flores Sánchez (born September 25, 1986, in Caracas) is a Venezuelan model who was selected Mister Venezuela in 2009. Flores was also a rugby player and graduated from Business Management, majoring in Finance & Banking, with a minor in Globalization in the Universidad Metropolitana, in Caracas. He stands 195 cm (6'5").

Flores was the Venezuelan delegate for the Mister World 2010 pageant. 

As of 2011, Flores worked with Venezuelan-based Record Label Cacao Music.

References

External links
Mister World Official Site

Male beauty pageant winners
Living people
People from Caracas
Venezuelan male models
1986 births